The Alliance of Arts and Literature Associations of Vietnam (Liên hiệp các Hội Văn học nghệ thuật Việt Nam) is the senior official body representing all the culture associations in Vietnam. It was founded 1957-1958 as the bodies beneath it were also founded.

Constituent bodies
 Vietnam Writers' Association' (Hội Nhà văn Việt Nam) - The association awards its own book prize each year. This is one of the official culture associations in Vietnam. It was founded 1957 under the Alliance of Arts and Literature Associations in Vietnam. The association awards its own book prize each year: the Vietnamese Writers Association Prize.
 Vietnam Fine Arts Association
 Vietnam Musicians' Association
 Vietnam Association of Dramatic Artists (Cinema Artists' Association)
 Vietnam Association of Architects
 Vietnamese Film Board
 Vietnam Association of Dance Artists
 Folk Arts Association of Vietnam
 Literature and Art Association of Vietnamese Ethnic Minorities
 Vietnam Association of Photographic Artists

The body does not include the Vietnam Journalists' Association.

References

Vietnam Association of Photographic Artists
Vietnamese writers' organizations
Vietnam
Organizations established in 1957
1957 establishments in Vietnam